Wellington is the capital city of New Zealand.

Wellington may also refer to:

People 
 Duke of Wellington (title), including a list of people who held the title

Surname
 Alex Wellington, also known as "Duke" (1891–1967), Canadian ice hockey player
 Altemont Wellington (born 1934), Jamaican cricketer
 Arthur Wellesley, 1st Duke of Wellington (1769–1852), British commander at Waterloo and Prime Minister
 Arthur Wellesley, 2nd Duke of Wellington (1807–1884), British Lieutenant-General
 Arthur M. Wellington (1847–1895), American civil engineer and author 
 B. Wellington, Indian politician and Health Minister of Kerala State
 Beatrice Wellington (1907–1971), Canadian Quaker rescuer of Jewish children from pre-World War II Prague
 Ben Wellington (born 1974), English cricketer
 Biff Wellington (1965–2007), Canadian professional wrestler
 Calvin Wellington (born 1995), Welsh rugby league footballer
 Chrissie Wellington (born 1977), English triathlete
 Clement Wellington (1880–1956), Australian cricketer
 David Wellington (disambiguation), several people and characters
 George B. Wellington (1856–1921), New York state senator
 George L. Wellington (1852–1927), U.S. Senator from Maryland
 Harry H. Wellington (1926–2011), Dean of Yale Law School (1975–1985) and of New York Law School (1992–2000)
 Henry Wellesley, 3rd Duke of Wellington (1846–1900), British peer and politician
 Justin Wellington (born 1978), Papua New Guinean international singer
 Lydia Wellington, New York City Ballet dancer
 Orlando Wellington, Ghanaian football manager and coach
 Peter Wellington (born 1957), Australian politician
 Roderick Wellington, also known as "The Duke" (born 1978), British basketball player
 Renaldo Wellington (born 1999), Jamaican footballer
 Sheena Wellington (born 1944), Scottish singer
 Stephen Wellington (1899–1974), Australian cricketer
 Stuart Wellington, American comedian and bar proprietor
 Ted Wellington (1921–2004), Australian rules footballer 
 Terra Wellington, American actress, television personality and author 
 Tom Wellington (footballer, born 1894) (1894–1955), Australian footballer for Melbourne
 Tom Wellington (footballer, born 1921) (1921–1998), Australian footballer for Hawthorn
 Valerie Wellington (1959–1993), American singer
 Wilfrid Wellington, Anglican priest in South Africa

Given name
 Wellington (footballer), many Brazilian footballers named Wellington
 Wellington Albert (born 1994), Papua New Guinean Rugby League player
 Wellington Carvalho dos Santos, Brazilian footballer 
 Wellington "Megaton" Dias, Brazilian jiu-jitsu (BJJ) practitioner 
 Wellington Fagundes (born 1957), Brazilian Senator for Mato Grosso
 Wellington Gonçalves (born 1983), Brazilian footballer 
 Wellington Jighere, Nigerian Scrabble player
 Wellington Koo (1887–1985), Chinese diplomat
 Wellington Lima (acrobat) (born 1979), Brazilian artistic acrobat and performer
 Wellington Mara (1916–2006), American NFL team owner
 Wellington Masakadza (born 1993), Zimbabwean cricketer
 Wellington Nem (born 1992), Brazilian footballer 
 ʻUelingatoni Ngū (1854–1885), Tongan crown prince from 1879 to 1885
 Wellington A. Playter (1879–1937), English actor
 Wellington Reiter (born 1957), American architect and urban designer
 Wellington Sandoval, Peruvian Defense Minister
 Wellington Turman (born 1996), Brazilian professional mixed martial artist
 Wellington Webb (born 1941), American politician
 Wellington Willoughby (1859–1932), Canadian politician and lawyer

Armed forces 
 HMNZS Wellington, Royal New Zealand Navy ships named Wellington
 HMS Duke of Wellington, at least two ships
 HMS Wellington, one of several Royal Navy vessels
 Vickers Wellington, British medium bomber used in the Second World War
 The Duke of Wellington's Regiment, former infantry regiment in the British Army

Places

Australia
 Fort Wellington, Australia, Northern Territory
 Wellington Park, Tasmania, a locality
 Wellington Park, a protected area
 Wellington Range
 Mount Wellington (Tasmania)
 Shire of Wellington, Victoria
 Wellington, New South Wales
 Wellington Range, Northern Territory
 Wellington Secondary College
 Wellington, South Australia

Canada

Places
 Wellington, Newfoundland and Labrador
 Wellington, Nova Scotia, in the Halifax Regional Municipality
 Wellington, Yarmouth, Nova Scotia
 Wellington, Queens, Nova Scotia, in the Region of Queens Municipality 
 Wellington, Prince Edward Island
 Wellington Parish, New Brunswick
 Wellington County, Ontario, which encompasses the townships of Centre Wellington, Ontario and Wellington North, Ontario
 Wellington, Ontario, a town in Prince Edward County
 Rural Municipality of Wellington No. 97, Saskatchewan
 Wellington, Edmonton, Alberta
 Wellington, British Columbia, Nanaimo Regional District
 Wellington Bay, Nunavut, Canada

Electoral districts
 Wellington (Manitoba provincial electoral district), an electoral district of Manitoba
 Wellington (Ontario provincial electoral district), a defunct electoral district of Ontario

Chile
 Little Wellington Island, Aisén Region
 Wellington Island, Magallanes Region

India
 Wellington, Tamil Nadu
 Wellington Cantonment

New Zealand
 Wellington, New Zealand's capital city
 Wellington City Council
 Wellington metropolitan area 
 Wellington Region
 Wellington Province
 Wellington (New Zealand electorate)
 Wellington Suburbs (disambiguation), various places
 Mount Wellington, New Zealand

South Africa
 Wellington, Western Cape, Western Cape Province

United Kingdom

Settlements
 Wellington, Cumbria
 Wellington, Herefordshire
 Wellington, Shropshire
 Wellington, Somerset, from which the title Duke of Wellington is taken
 Calstone Wellington, Wiltshire
 Wellington Court, Weymouth, Dorset

Constituencies
 Wellington (Shropshire) (UK Parliament constituency)
 Wellington (Somerset) (UK Parliament constituency)

Schools and clubs
 Wellington College Belfast
 Wellington College, Berkshire
 Wellington School, Ayr
 Wellington School, Somerset

United States
 Wellington, Alabama
 Wellington, Colorado
 Wellington, Florida
 Wellington, Illinois
 Wellington, Kansas
 Wellington, Kentucky
 Wellington, Menifee County, Kentucky
 Wellington, Maine
 Wellington, Michigan
 Wellington, Missouri
 Wellington, Nevada
 Wellington, Ohio
 Wellington, Texas
 Wellington, Utah
 Wellington, Washington
 Wellington, Wisconsin
 Wellington Township (disambiguation)

Businesses
 Daniel Wellington, a Swedish brand
 Wellington Fund, a mutual fund from the Vanguard group
 Wellington Management Company, a Boston-based investment management firm
 Wellington Partners Venture Capital, a pan-European venture capital firm
 Wellington Piano Company, a subsidiary of the American Cable Piano Company

Fiction
 David Wellington (Homeland), a fictional character from the series Homeland
 A character in the British comic strip The Perishers
 A character in The Wombles, a series of books and a children's TV series based on them
 A dog in the novel The Curious Incident of the Dog in the Night-Time by Mark Haddon
 "Throat-Slasher" Wellington, a character cliché of Arthur Wellesley, 1st Duke of Wellington in the Blackadder the Third episode "Duel and Duality"

Transportation
 A GWR 3031 Class locomotive on the Great Western Railway
 A GWR 4073 Class locomotive on the Great Western Railway
 An SR V "Schools" class locomotive on the Southern Railway between

Other uses
 Wellington boot, a type of boot 
 Wellington Formation, a geologic unit named for Wellington, Kansas 
 Beef Wellington, a steak dish of English origin

See also 
 Wellington station (disambiguation)
 List of monuments to Arthur Wellesley, 1st Duke of Wellington
 
 Willingdon (disambiguation)
 Wennington (disambiguation)
 Welly (disambiguation)

English-language surnames